A list of films produced in South Korea in 1965:

External links
1965 in South Korea

 1960-1969 at koreanfilm.org

South Korea
1965
Films